Adam Fox is a paediatric allergy consultant and a child allergy specialist. He is President of the British Society of Allergy and Clinical Immunology, and he won the Raymond Horton-Smith Prize in 2012 for his doctoral thesis.

Education and career
Fox read medicine and neuroscience at the University of Cambridge and completed his clinical training at University College London. Initially, Fox trained as a general paediatrician. However, he decided to specialise in paediatric allergies whilst doing his Master's in clinical paediatrics at Great Ormond St Hospital.  Fox took a specialist registrar post at St Mary's Hospital, London, which at the time was the only dedicated paediatric allergy research centre. Here, he became further specialised as a tertiary paediatric allergist.

Fox spent nine years as the clinical lead of Allergy at Guy's & St Thomas' Hospitals, London and a further three years as their clinical director for Specialist ambulatory medicine. He is currently the Commercial Medical Director for the hospital's NHS Foundation Trust.

He helped lead the access of UK patients to treatments such as sublingual immunotherapy, established the largest NHS Children's clinic for this treatment. Fox was the senior author of the International Milk Allergy in Primary Care (iMAP) guideline, published in 2017 and updated in 2019.

In 2012 Cambridge University awarded him the Raymond Horton-Smith Prize for his doctoral thesis on peanut allergies,  

In 2018, the British Society of Clinical Immunology elected Fox as their president.

Awards
Raymond Horton-Smith Prize 2011 - 2012  
National Clinical Excellence Award, 2020  
William Frankland Award, 2015

Selected publications
Ludman S, Shah N, Fox AT. Managing Cow's Milk Allergy in Children. British Medical Journal 2013;347:f5424.
Anagnostou K, Stiefel G, Brough HE, Du Toit G, Lack G, Fox AT. Active Management of Food Allergy – an emerging concept. Archives of Disease in Childhood 2015 Apr;100(4):386-90.
Fox AT, Sasieni P, du Toit G, Syed H, Lack G. Household Peanut Consumption as a risk factor for the development of peanut allergy. Journal of Allergy and Clinical Immunology.''' 2009 Feb;123(2):417-23.
Fox AT, Kaymakcalan H, Perkin M, du Toit G, Lack G. Changes in peanut allergy prevalence in different ethnic groups in 2 time periods.  Journal of Allergy and Clinical Immunology  2015 Feb;135(2):580-2.
Fox AT, Brown T, Walsh J, Venter C, Meyer R, Nowak-Wegrzyn A, Levin M, Spawls H, Beatson J, Lovis M-T, Vieira MC, Fleischer D. An Update to the Milk Allergy in Primary Care guideline. Clinical and Translational Allergy 2019.
Du Toit G, Katz Y, Sasieni P, Mesher D, Maleki SJ, Fisher HR, Fox AT, Turcanu V, Amir T, Zadik-Mnuhin G, Cohen A. Early consumption of peanuts in infancy is associated with a low prevalence of peanut allergy.  Journal of Allergy and Clinical Immunology'' 2008 Nov 1;122(5):984-91. His most cited paper, it has been cited 885 times according to Google Scholar,

References

British nutritionists
British paediatricians
Year of birth missing (living people)
Living people